Australian Feminist Studies is a quarterly peer-reviewed academic journal covering feminist studies. It was established in 1985 and is published by Routledge. The founding editor-in-chief was Susan Magarey (University of Adelaide). She was succeeded as editor by Mary Spongberg (University of Technology Sydney). The current editors are Lisa Adkins (University of Sydney) and Maryanne Dever (The Australian National University ). The journal was formerly published twice a year.

Abstracting and indexing 
The journal is abstracted and indexed in:

According to the Journal Citation Reports, the journal has a 2015 impact factor of 0.500, ranking it 29th out of 40 journals in the category "Women's Studies".

See also 
 Feminist theory
 Gender studies
 List of women's studies journals
 Women's liberation movement
 Women's studies

References

External links 
 

English-language journals
Feminist journals
Publications established in 1985
Quarterly journals
Routledge academic journals
Women's studies journals
Biannual journals
1985 establishments in Australia